Plummer Glacier is a short glacier descending east through the Enterprise Hills to the north of Lippert Peak and the Douglas Peaks, in the Heritage Range in Antarctica. Mapped by United States Geological Survey (USGS) from surveys and U.S. Navy air photos, 1961–66. Named by Advisory Committee on Antarctic Names (US-ACAN) for Charles C. Plummer, United States Antarctic Research Program (USARP) glaciologist at Palmer Station in 1965.

See also
 List of glaciers in the Antarctic
 Glaciology

References
 

Glaciers of Ellsworth Land